Bill Townsend founded Barrett Technology in 1988.  He is credited with introducing the WAM arm, the first haptic robot and one of the first haptic devices based on novel differential and high-speed cable drives.

Bill holds engineering PhD'88 and MS'84 degrees from the Massachusetts Institute of Technology and a BS'82 from Northeastern University.  He has been awarded nine US patents and won several professional awards including The Robotics Industries Association’s Joseph Engelberger Award in 2003 for pioneering the first haptic robot in the 1980s.

References

American businesspeople
Living people
Year of birth missing (living people)